Hossein Tehrāni (1912 – February 26, 1974) was an Iranian musician and tonbak player. He is regarded as an innovator, expanding the modern tonbak into an instrument that can be played solo, in addition to its earlier role as an accompaniment instrument. Tehrani added to the instrument's possibilities with added "beating methods" and played his instrument with different "sonorities."

Early life
He was born in Tehran, Iran. At an early age he was going to Zurkhaneh -زورخانه (an Iranian gymnasium) and was impressed by the big clay vase covered on open bottom with skin called Zarb- ضربZurkhaneh. At age if 13 Hossein found a similar type of Zarb Zurkhaneh in a smaller size which was called tonbakتنبك and began practicing by himself.

Musical education
In 1928 Hossein Tehrani became interested in studying music professionally, and took private lessons from music master and kamanchehكمانچه player Hossein Khan Esmail-Zadeh. Hossein was keen to observe different tonbak playing styles so he attended the music classes of master tonbak players such as Reza Ravanbakhsh and Kangarlo. He wanted to learn more about Iranian traditional music, and therefore formed a relationship with the great music master and multi-instrumentalist Abolhasan Saba, from whom he learnt music theory and different aspects of Iranian traditional music.

Music career
 
In 1940 the first radio station was established in Tehran and Hossein Tehrani was an active tonbak player accompanying musicians while performing live music programmes. He was a permanent member of the National Music Ensemble and National Music association. Hossein Tehrani formed and organized a tonbak players ensemble with seven members and performed several pieces with his group for the first time at the Shiraz Arts Festival- (جشن هنر شیراز) the group performed several concerts in Talar Vahadat, formerly Talar Roudaki.

While playing the Tonbak Hossein could imitate the sound of a locomotive and a motorcycle to  astonish his listeners.

Tutoring career
Hossein Tehrani was a tonbak instructor at the College of Music (مدرسه عالی موسیقی) and the National Music College of Tehran. Tehrani innovated a rhythm technique, which involved the tonbak being played in harmony with the saying of Persian phrases such as baleh vo baleh, baleh digeh and yek sad-o bist-o panj.

Literary work
Hossein wrote a book titled Amouzesh Tonbak-ٱموزش تنبك about the style and practice of the tonbak.

Resting place
Hossein Tehrani is buried in the Zahir od-Dowleh cemetery, Darband, Shemiran, Tehran.

References

Haghighat, A., Honarmandan e Irani az Aghaz ta Emrooz, Koomesh Publication, 2004, (in Persian)
Khaleghi, R., Sargozasht e Musighi e Iran, Ferdowsi Publication, 1955, (in Persian)

External links

 https://web.archive.org/web/20070405025213/http://www.donbak.co.uk/artists/ostad_hosain_tehrani.htm
 Biography of Hossein Tehrani on Iran Chamber Society: www.iranchamber.com
 https://www.youtube.com/watch?v=6KWyjJ1vbcc
 https://www.youtube.com/watch?v=IHTJxVXUrCA&mode=related&search=
 https://www.youtube.com/watch?v=o3XUolbdXks&eurl=http%3A%2F%2Fwww%2Epefs%2Eus%2Fviewvideo%2Ephp%3Fid%3Do3XUolbdXks

1912 births
1974 deaths
Iranian tonbak players
20th-century drummers